Matheus Wilhelmus Theodorus "Theo" Laseroms (8 March 1940 – 25 April 1991) was a Dutch football defender who made a name for himself when he played for Feijenoord. He gained six caps for the Netherlands national team.

Club career
Laseroms, nicknamed De Tank or Theo de Tank, was famous for his sliding tackle. His career had started in 1956 at RBC, followed in 1958 by NAC. In 1963, he switched to Sparta, with whom he won the KNVB Cup in 1966. In 1967, Laseroms signed with the Pittsburgh Phantoms of the newly created National Professional Soccer League while still under contract with Sparta Rotterdam. Sparta sued Pittsburgh in both the United States and the Netherlands and received $50,000 from the Phantoms.

In 1968 he moved to Feijenoord where he would form the defensive core alongside Rinus Israël. He played four seasons for Feijenoord through late sixties and early seventies. Laseroms was part of the team that won the European Cup in 1970 after a 2–1 final win over Celtic and in that same year the Intercontinental Cup against Argentinian club Estudiantes de La Plata. He also became champion twice with Feijenoord, in the seasons 1968–69 and 1970–71. In the seasons 1969–70 and 1971–72, Laseroms finished in second place with Feyenoord. The KNVB Cup was won in the 1968–69 season. He was part of the legendary team that included Eddy Pieters Graafland, Eddy Treijtel, Piet Romeijn, Rinus Israël, Theo van Duivenbode, Franz Hasil, Wim Jansen, Willem van Hanegem, Henk Wery, Ove Kindvall and Coen Moulijn.

After leaving the club in 1972, he played for the Belgian club Gent for two more years.

International career 
In 1965 he made his first international appearance for the Netherlands against Northern Ireland.

Managerial career 
Laseroms did an internship at Ajax in Amsterdam in the 1975–76 season before obtaining his training diploma; a team then consisting of players such as Frank Arnesen, Søren Lerby, Tscheu La Ling and Ruud Geels and was coached by Rinus Michels in his second period. Laseroms then started a less successful coaching career with Heracles, Helmond Sport, Vlaardingen '74, Trabzonspor and clubs from Bahrain and Saudi Arabia, among others.

Death 
Laseroms died of heart attack on 25 April 1991, aged only 51.

Honours

Player 
Sparta
KNVB Cup: 1965–66

Feyenoord
Eredivisie: 1968–69, 1970–71
KNVB Cup: 1968–69
European Cup: 1969–70
Intercontinental Cup: 1970

References

External links

Theo Laseroms at nasljerseys.com

1940 births
1991 deaths
Sportspeople from Roosendaal
Dutch footballers
Dutch expatriate footballers
Netherlands international footballers
Dutch football managers
Dutch expatriate football managers
Association football defenders
Feyenoord players
Sparta Rotterdam players
RBC Roosendaal players
NAC Breda players
National Professional Soccer League (1967) players
Pittsburgh Phantoms players
Expatriate soccer players in the United States
Dutch expatriate sportspeople in the United States
PEC Zwolle managers
Heracles Almelo managers
Helmond Sport managers
Eredivisie players
UEFA Champions League winning players
Fortuna Vlaardingen managers
Footballers from North Brabant
Dutch expatriate sportspeople in Belgium
Expatriate footballers in Belgium
Expatriate football managers in Turkey
Expatriate football managers in Oman
Expatriate football managers in Bahrain
Bahrain national football team managers
Dutch expatriate sportspeople in Bahrain
Dutch expatriate sportspeople in Oman
Dutch expatriate sportspeople in Turkey
K.A.A. Gent players
Belgian Pro League players
Trabzonspor managers
Al-Nahda Club (Oman) managers
Riffa SC managers